Zhanna Dmitriyevna Yorkina (6 May 1939  25 May 2015) was a Soviet Cosmonaut.

Zhanna Yorkinna was born in Soltsy, which was located in Novograd Oblast in the USSR.  She would graduate from the Pedagogic Institute in the city of Ryazan in the USSR with a degree in English. She was also able to speak both German and French which greatly aided her in her selection as a cosmonaut. In December 1961, the selection of female cosmonaut trainees was authorized by the Soviet government, with the specific intention of ensuring the first woman in space was a Soviet citizen. In February 1962, Yorkina was selected as a member of a group of five female cosmonauts to be trained for a solo spaceflight in a Vostok spacecraft. She was selected to be a female cosmonaut on 4 March 1962. She would then become approved by the Soviet Medical Commission on 3 April 1962. Her hobby of parachuting is what led her to be an excellent candidate for the cosmonaut space program. She was a club Parachutist at Ryazan while also working her job as a high school teacher. At the young age of 22, Zhanna Yorkina was working as a high school language teacher when she was asked by the Soviet government if she would be willing to take a test, though they misled her explaining if she passed the test she would get to jump from a ship. Later she discovered that she would actually be jumping from a spaceship. Like several others in the group, she was an amateur parachutist. Being a qualified parachutists was almost a necessary skill set to have during the screening process. While at the time it was considered to be a classified reason, it was later revealed that due to the early models of Soviet spacecraft, it required the cosmonauts to be ejected from their capsules and deploy a parachute and land separately from the spacecraft. In order to meet the qualifications and rigors for the space program the female candidates also needed to be less the 30 years old, under 5 feet 7 inches and less than 154 pounds. Zhanna Yorkina, along with the other four women chosen for the Soviet space program, had to endure some of the most intense training programs and only had 6 months to complete this because the USSR did not want the Americans to beat them in having the first woman in space. The training included instructional classes in astronomy and aeronautics and a physical training component consisting of swimming and gymnastics. They also had to undergo centrifuge training which Zhanna Yorkina recalled being very difficult. She stated, "This does not feel nice. If you relax your abdomen, you will get unconscious, which often happened to the men as well. We had a remote control in our hands while testing. If you hold it, it means you were conscious. If not, you have passed out, and they take you out." They also had to go through heat chamber acclimation where they were exposed to temperatures as high as 103 degrees Fahrenheit with 30 percent humidity.

In 1963, she married Valery Sergeychik, with whom she had two children, Valery and Svetlana, in violation of Korolyov's rule that female cosmonauts must put off having children and dedicate themselves to the space program.

The honor of being the first woman in space was eventually given to Valentina Tereshkova, who was launched into Earth orbit in June 1963 aboard Vostok 6. Tereshkova's backup was Irina Solovyova, with Valentina Ponomaryova in a supporting "second backup" role. Yorkina suffered another major setback when she obtained an ankle injury in a parachuting mishap. This ankle injury would cause her to miss part of training which set her back against her peers. Yorkina had been taken out of the running for the mission as she had performed poorly in the simulator. In April 1963, all four female cosmonauts completed a three day simulation in the Vostok Simulator. While all four of them passed, Yorkina would prove to be the least equipped to handle space flight. Yorkina would choose to only eat a third of her allotted rations and she also removed her boots on the first day of the simulation. Both of these factors would lead to her fainting shortly after the test. She was very weak compared to the other female cosmonauts.

After the flight of Vostok 6, Yorkina would work on the Voskhod 2 mission in 1965. This mission was famous for being the first spacewalk in history. It was after this mission she was appointed as backup commander of Voskhod 4. Voskhod 4 was a 20 day single man mission which studied long term weightlessness with various experiments. The mission would then be cancelled in 1966 leaving Yorkina to train in Soyuz until the eventual disbanding of the female cosmonaut team. 

Yorkina was considered one of the least capable of the five female cosmonauts, and Kamanin specifically complained that she was "too fond of chocolate and cakes".  She was included in plans for Vostok 5, an all-female duration and EVA mission, but only as the secondary member of the backup crew. One of the other issues that arose for the all-female EVA mission of Voskhod 5 was that Zvezda, the company that developed the suits for space environments, declined to fabricate a special EVA suit for the women. This caused further delays to the mission and its eventual cancellation of any more planned Voskhod missions after Vostok 6. Following the death of Sergei Korolev, the space program was halted and all cosmonauts were moved to the development of the Soyuz. Originally, the Vostok 5 and 6 flights were meant to be dual flights in which two ships would be launched one day apart to both be in space for around three days. Yorkina and Ponomaryova would later be chosen to be part of the Vostok 6A flight. Two groups of two would be chosen for the dual flights, Tereshkova and Solovyova(backup), and Ponomaryova and Yorkina(backup). This dual flight approach was created by Sergei Korolev and was on its path to completion all the way up until 21 March 1963 where Ministry of Defense Chief Ustinov, Kozlov, and Vershinin fully rejected the proposal. Eventually, the Vostok program settled on a single flight approach which saw Tereshkova had into space. Eventually all the other female cosmonauts never flew.

Following cancellation of the Voskhod Program, Yorkina worked at the Gagarin Cosmonaut Training Center, and was one of the cosmonauts involved in development of the Spiral spaceplane.  She retired from the space program on 1 October 1969, and from active military duty in 1989. She achieved the rank of Lieutenant Colonel in the Air Force Reserve.

References

External links
Жанна Дмитриевна Ёркина (Сегрейчик). CV in Russian

Soviet cosmonauts
Women astronauts
1939 births
2015 deaths
Soviet women aviators